Khurukra is a rural locality (a selo) in Khurinsky Selsoviet, Laksky District, Republic of Dagestan, Russia. The population was 193 as of 2010. There are 2 streets.

Geography 
Khurukra is located 3 km southeast of Kumukh (the district's administrative centre) by road, on the left bank of the Kazikumukhskoye Koysu River. Khuri and Kumukh are the nearest rural localities.

Nationalities 
Laks live there.

Famous residents 
 Mueddin Charinov (poet)
 Abdul Akhmedov (People's Architect of the USSR, laureate of the USSR State Prize) 
 Yusup Khapalayev (poet)
 Abdurakhman Omarshayev (poet)
 Adam Adamov (poet)

References 

Rural localities in Laksky District